Jeremy Isadore "Jerry" Levin (March 20, 1932 – February 6, 2020) was an American television journalist. He wrote on nonviolence, with an emphasis on the Middle East and in particular Palestine and Israel.

In 1984, while working for CNN, he was kidnapped and held hostage by Hezbollah. He escaped after eleven and a half
months in captivity due to the nonviolent behind-the-scene efforts of friends and colleagues organized by his wife, Sis Levin. Of Jewish birth, Levin converted to Christianity during his captivity.

In 1991, his story was made into the television film Held Hostage. The film stars David Dukes as Levin.

He worked with several violence reduction organizations in the West Bank and Gaza, including Christian Peacemaker Teams) and with nonviolent peace and
nonviolent justice organizations in the U.S.

In April 2009 he and his wife were recognized by the Dalai Lama as one of
2009's "Unsung Heroes of Compassion".

Personal life
Levin was born in Detroit in 1932. He attended Northwestern University and was in the United States Navy. He and his wife, Lucile "Sis" Levin (née Moss) had six children. Levin lived in Birmingham, Alabama at the end of his life, and died on February 6, 2020, at the age of 87.

Books
Jerry Levin. Reflections on My First Noël. (Pasadena: Hope Publishing, 2002). .
Jerry Levin. West Bank Diary: Middle East Violence as Reported by a Former American Hostage. (Pasadena: Hope Publishing, 2005). .

References

External links
 Levin's blog (archived)

1932 births
2020 deaths
20th-century American journalists
21st-century American memoirists
American male journalists
American television journalists
CNN people
Converts to Christianity from Judaism
Journalists from Michigan
Kidnappings by Islamists
Northwestern University alumni
People from Birmingham, Alabama
United States Navy sailors
Writers from Detroit